The list of ship launches in 1774 includes a chronological list of some ships launched in 1774.


References

1774
Ship launches